Taiyanggong Station is a subway station on Line 10 of the Beijing Subway.

Station layout 
The station has an underground island platform.

Exits 
There are 4 exits, lettered A, B, C, and D. Exit C is accessible.

Gallery

External links

Beijing Subway stations in Chaoyang District
Railway stations in China opened in 2008